Tanah Merah (Tanahmerah) may refer to either of two Papuan languages:
Sumeri language (Trans–New Guinea)
Tabla language (Sentani)

See also
 Tanah Merah (disambiguation)